Colias dubia, the dwarf clouded yellow, is a small butterfly of the family Pieridae, that is, the yellows and whites, that is found in India.

See also
List of butterflies of India
List of butterflies of India (Pieridae)

References

  
 
 
 

dubia
Butterflies of Asia
Butterflies described in 1906